Renfrewshire was a county constituency of the House of Commons of the Parliament of Great Britain from 1708 until 1801 and of the Parliament of the United Kingdom from 1801 to 1885.

Creation
The British parliamentary constituency was created in 1708 following the Acts of Union, 1707 and replaced the former Parliament of Scotland shire constituency of Renfrewshire.

Boundaries
The constituency covered the county of Renfrewshire, minus the parliamentary burgh of Renfrew throughout the 1708 to 1885 period, and minus the parliamentary burgh of Port Glasgow and the Paisley and Greenock constituencies from 1832 to 1885.

The burgh of Renfrew was a component of Glasgow Burghs until 1832, when it became a component of Kilmarnock Burghs. Port Glasgow became a parliamentary burgh in 1832, and another component of Kilmarnock Burghs.

History
The constituency elected one Member of Parliament (MP) by the first past the post system until the seat was abolished in 1885.

In 1885 the Renfrewshire constituency area was divided into two new constituencies: Renfrewshire Eastern and Renfrewshire Western.

Members of Parliament

Election results

Elections in the 1830s

Shaw-Stewart's death caused a by-election.

Elections in the 1840s

Stewart's death caused a by-election.

Elections in the 1850s

Mure resigned by accepting the office of Steward of the Chiltern Hundreds, causing a by-election.

Elections in the 1860s

Speirs' death caused a by-election.

Elections in the 1870s
Bruce was elevated to the peerage, becoming Lord Aberdare and causing a by-election.

Elections in the 1880s

Mure's death caused a by-election.

References

 History of Parliament - constituencies

Historic parliamentary constituencies in Scotland (Westminster)
Constituencies of the Parliament of the United Kingdom established in 1708
Constituencies of the Parliament of the United Kingdom disestablished in 1885
Politics of Renfrewshire